Sabalia barnsi is a moth in the family Brahmaeidae (older classifications placed it in Lemoniidae). It was described by Louis Beethoven Prout in 1918.

References

Brahmaeidae
Moths described in 1918